The BioGems Initiative is a set of ecological activism efforts launched by the Washington, DC based nonprofit organization Natural Resources Defense Council in 2001.  The effort's objective is to mobilize concerned entities in defending exceptionally valuable ecosystems at risk of destruction.

References 

Environmentalism in the United States